= Madam Kilay =

Filipino YouTuber and comedian

- Born: Jinky Cubillan; November 21, 1986 (age 39); Bohol, Philippines
- Other names: Jinky Cubillan Anderson, Jinky Anderson
- Citizenship: Filipino
- Occupations: YouTuber; Comedian; Vlogger; Social media personality
- Years active: 2016–present
- Known for: Comedy vlogs; signature bold eyebrows

Jinky Cubillan Anderson (born November 21), known professionally as Madam Kilay, is a Filipino YouTuber, comedian and social media personality. She is known for her comedy vlogs and signature bold eyebrows.

== Early life ==
Cubillan was born in Bohol, Philippines. Before becoming a content creator she worked many jobs, including as a bartender and factory worker. She lived in South Korea for some years and then in the United States.

== Career ==
She started uploading content on YouTube somewhere in 2016-2017 as Madam Kilay. Where her comic and personal narrative videos has entertained millions of people. This has earned her 1.8 million to her channels.

She has been featured on Philippine television, including a guest stint on variety show Eat Bulaga!. Her life story was turned into the GMA anthology program Magpakailanman episode "Ang Kwento ni Madam Kilay".

She is also active on TikTok and other platforms, where she continues to post comedy and lifestyle content.

== Personal life ==
Cubillan has been married and has children, she has lived in the United States and has shared stories of her family life and relationships in her videos. Public reports have confirmed relationships with American partners, including a marriage to an American named Paul Anderson and later association with a partner named Michael.

In addition, she has formally addressed online controversies and personal incidents, including a viral video confrontation with a neighbor in the United States that was recorded and shared on her channels.
